Salvatore Octavio Abarca Reyes (born 13 May 1986), also known as Tore Abarca, is a Chilean former footballer who played as a forward for clubs in Chile and abroad.

Club career
As a youth player, Abarca was with both Cobresal and Magallanes. He made his professional debut with Magallanes at the age of sixteen and had two stints on loan with Hosanna and Provincial Talagante in the Chilean third level.

After a stint with Deportes Ovalle, even knocking Colo-Colo out from the 2008–09 Copa Chile and reaching the final match, he moved abroad and played for Ängelholms FF in Sweden, Triomphe de Liancourt in the Ligue Haïtienne, where he came thanks to the coach José Valladares and coincided with his compatriots Joaquín Gatica and Víctor Retamal, and Belgrano de Arequito in Argentina.

Back in Chile, he joined Provincial Talagante, becoming the top goalscorer of the Tercera A de Chile with seventeen goals. After, he played for Barnechea, San Antonio Unido and Deportes Valdivia.

His last club was Trasandino in 2016–17.

After football
Abarca went on playing football at amateur level in clubs such as Salesianos FC.

Honours
 Tercera División A de Chile Top Goalscorer:

References

External links
 
 

1986 births
Living people
Footballers from Santiago
Chilean footballers
Chilean expatriate footballers
Deportes Magallanes footballers
Provincial Talagante footballers
Magallanes footballers
Deportes Ovalle footballers
Ängelholms FF players
A.C. Barnechea footballers
San Antonio Unido footballers
Deportes Valdivia footballers
Trasandino footballers
Primera B de Chile players
Tercera División de Chile players
Superettan players
Ligue Haïtienne players
Segunda División Profesional de Chile players
Chilean expatriate sportspeople in Sweden
Chilean expatriate sportspeople in Haiti
Chilean expatriate sportspeople in Argentina
Expatriate footballers in Sweden
Expatriate footballers in Haiti
Expatriate footballers in Argentina
Association football forwards